Cornelius Asmund Palm (c. 1715 – 4 February 1780) was a Swedish representative consul and merchant. Based in Constantinople, Palm took up business in both Smyrna and Constantinople. He was a representative consul for the Kingdom of Sweden, serving the nation's interests in the Ottoman Empire, and director of the chartered Swedish Levant Company.

Life and work 
Asmund Palm was born in the 1710s. In his youth, he accompanied a Swedish ship with Constantinople as its destination. When it was about to unload, Palm fell ill and got hospitalized. During his stay at the hospital, Palm spent his time practicing the Turkish language. Then, he took up employment at Ali Schaffei's, practicing as a merchant in Constantinople.

Palm served as director of the Swedish Levant Company in Smyrna. He imported coffee beans, raisins, and oriental carpets to Sweden during his service. Together with Christian Hebbe (1725–1800), he was one of the company's most important people. Palm later moved to Constantinople after several years, where he was positioned as consul in the Ottoman Empire for the Swedish Empire.

Palm was married twice; to the daughter of his employer, Fatma, and to a Dutch noblewoman, Eva van Bruyn. He had three children with Van Bruyn, including Elisabeth, Gustaf (1760–1807), and Mimica Palm.

Palm moved to Sweden in the 1760s, where he died on 4 February 1780.

See also 

 Sweden–Turkey relations
 Levant Company

References

Further reading 

 

Year of birth unknown
1780 deaths
Swedish diplomats
Age of Liberty people
18th-century Swedish businesspeople
Ambassadors to the Ottoman Empire
Swedish merchants
Sweden–Turkey relations

Swedish Levant Company people